Wilanowiec  is a former settlement in the administrative district of Gmina Ujście, within Piła County, Greater Poland Voivodeship, in west-central Poland.

In 1934 the settlement had a population of 37.

References

Wilanowiec